Pope Benedict III (died 17 April 858) was the bishop of Rome and ruler of the Papal States from 29 September 855 to his death.

Early career
Little is known of Benedict's life before his papacy. His father was named Peter. Benedict was educated, and lived in Rome and was appointed by Pope Leo IV as cardinal-priest of the church of San Callisto. Benedict had a reputation for learning and piety.

Pontificate
Benedict III was elected upon the refusal of Adrian, the initial choice of the clergy and people. Arsenius, bishop of Horta, intercepted the legates sent to advise the emperor of the election and persuaded them to betray Benedict and convince the emperor name the bishop's son Anastasius instead. Anastasius had previously been excommunicated by Leo IV. The legates returned with the imperial envoys and had Benedict's election disavowed and Anastasius installed. Anastasius took his place at the Lateran and Benedict was imprisoned. However, local popular opinion was so strong that the Franks recognized Benedict's consecration. Benedict treated Anastasius and his adherents leniently. The schism helped to weaken the hold of the emperors upon the popes, especially upon their elections.

Benedict intervened in the conflict between Lothair II of Lotharingia, Louis II of Italy, and Charles of Provence on the death of their father, Emperor Lothair I. He wrote to the Frankish bishops, rebuking them for remaining silent in the face of the disorder affecting the Carolingian realms.

Æthelwulf of Wessex and his son, the future king Alfred the Great, visited Rome in Benedict's reign. The Schola Anglorum, which was destroyed by fire in 847, was restored by Benedict.

A medieval tradition claimed that Pope Joan, a woman disguised as a man, was Benedict's immediate predecessor. The legendary Joan is generally believed to be fictitious.

References

Sources

Encyclopædia Britannica, 9th edition (1880s) 
Baix, F. (1935). "Benoît III pape", in: Dictionnaire d'histoire et de géographie ecclésiastiques, VIII (Paris 1935), pp 14–27. 
Cheetham, Nicolas, Keepers of the Keys, New York: Charles Scribner's Sons, 1983.

External links
Bertolini, Ottorino (1966), "Benedetto III, papa", Dizionario Biografico degli Italiani Volume 8 (1966)  
Benedictus III, Opera Omnia, published by J. P. Migne, Patrologia Latina, with analytical indexes

Popes
9th-century cardinals
858 deaths
Burials at St. Peter's Basilica
Year of birth unknown
9th-century popes
Italian popes